Blueprinting can have several meanings.

 See blueprint for the method of preparing engineering drawings.
 See engine tuning for the method of improving engine performance.